Bread and Circuses is a live album by composer Graham Collier accompanied by the Collective featuring two suites performed in Australia and released on the Jazzprint label in 2002.

Reception

Allmusic said "Graham Collier has built a considerable legacy as a sophisticated composer of considerable depth, and this release builds on that foundation with further evidence of his extraordinary talents ...  The Australian Collective acquits itself well, with powerful contributions from many players and tightly focused ensemble performances. For breadth of composition, strong improvisations, and complex, largely conventional writing with a slightly leftward tint, there is very little around that competes with Graham Collier at his best, and this album is among his finest".

Track listing
All compositions by Graham Collier.

 "Bread and Circuses: Introduction" - 2:53
 "Bread and Circuses: Ballad One" - 2:28
 "Bread and Circuses: Clapping" - 4:33
 "Bread and Circuses: Pattern One" - 5:25
 "Bread and Circuses: Interlude" - 1:54
 "Bread and Circuses: Pattern Two" - 5:29
 "Bread and Circuses: Ballad Two" - 3:10
 "Bread and Circuses: Blues" - 5:51
 "Bread and Circuses: Coda" - 3:02
 "Oxford Palms: Picky Blues and Ballad One" - 3:14
 "Oxford Palms: Open Blues and Ballad Two" - 6:01
 "Oxford Palms: One Note Blues and Ballad Three" - 4:26
 "Oxford Palms: Clapping Blues and Ballad Four" - 5:49

Personnel
Graham Collier – composer
Adrian Kelly – trumpet
Lucy Fisher – violin
Stephanie Dean – violin
Martin Payne – viola
Jenny Tingley – cello
Lindsay Vickery – soprano saxophone
Graeme Blevins – alto saxophone
Lee Buddle – baritone saxophone
Jeremy Greig – trombone
Kieran Hurley – trombone
Matthew Savage – trombone, euphonium
Phil Waldron – bass
Grant Windsor – piano
Tom O'Halloran – piano
Steve Richter – percussion, marimba
Hans Drieberg – drums, percussion

References

2002 live albums
Graham Collier live albums